Blind Pew or Pew is a character in Treasure Island by Robert Louis Stevenson.

Blind Pew may also refer to:
 Blind Pew, the fourth hole at Spyglass Hill Golf Course